Toivo Salo (22 January 1909 – 5 April 1981) was a Finnish chess player, three-time Finnish Chess Championship winner (1938, 1949, 1956).

Biography
From the late 1930s to the early 1960s, Toivo Salo was one of Finland's leading chess players. In Finnish Chess Championships he has won three gold (1938, 1949, 1956), five silver (1936, 1937, 1950, 1953, 1957) and bronze (1952) medals.

Toivo Salo played for Finland in the Chess Olympiads:
 In 1935, at reserve board in the 6th Chess Olympiad in Warsaw (+1, =3, -3),
 In 1937, at fourth reserve board in the 7th Chess Olympiad in Stockholm (+4, =5, -5),
 In 1952, at fourth board in the 10th Chess Olympiad in Helsinki (+2, =3, -4),
 In 1954, at first board in the 11th Chess Olympiad in Amsterdam (+1, =3, -7),
 In 1956, at second board in the 12th Chess Olympiad in Moscow (+2, =4, -8).

Toivo Salo played for Finland in the unofficial Chess Olympiad:
 In 1936, at fourth board in the 3rd unofficial Chess Olympiad in Munich (+5, =7, -5).

Toivo Salo played for Finland in the European Team Chess Championship preliminaries:
 In 1961, at second board (+1, =2, -1).

References

External links

Toivo Salo chess games at 365chess.com

1909 births
1981 deaths
Sportspeople from Helsinki
Finnish chess players
Chess Olympiad competitors
20th-century chess players